CNN Indonesia  is a television newscast aired on Indonesian television network CNN Indonesia, Trans TV and Trans7. The slogan is News We Can Trust.

The program is broadcast in the morning (as Redaksi Pagi) (with Trans7), (CNN Indonesia New Day) and (CNN Indonesia Good Morning) (with Trans TV), morning ahead noon (as CNN Indonesia Today), noon (as CNN Indonesia News Hour), afternoon (as Redaksi) (with Trans7) and (as CNN Indonesia News Update) (with Trans TV), evening (as CNN Indonesia News Room), night (as CNN Indonesia Prime News) (formerly with Trans TV) and (Redaksi Malam) (with Trans7), and formerly in the noon (as Redaksi CNN Indonesia Siang) (with Trans7).

References

External links 

 CNN Indonesia official website

Indonesian television news shows
Indonesian-language television shows
2015 Indonesian television series debuts
2010s Indonesian television series
Trans TV original programming
Trans7 original programming
CNN Indonesia original programming